XHJAP-FM is a radio station in Villahermosa, Tabasco, Mexico. Broadcasting on 90.9 FM, XHJAP is owned by Grupo Cantón and is known as La Guapachosa. It is co-owned with the Tabasco Hoy newspaper.

History
The station's concession was awarded in 1992. Until 2014, the station was known as Conexión 90.9, later becoming Tabasco Hoy Radio. That name is still used for the station during newscasts.

References

Radio stations in Tabasco
Villahermosa